The Victor A. Prather Award is an award established by the American Astronautical Society "to promote understanding of high altitude environment on humans." It is awarded to "researchers, engineers and flight crew members in the field of extravehicular protection or activity in space."

The award is in honor of Victor A. Prather, a Naval flight surgeon.

Recipients
Source: American Astronautical Society
1962 – Malcom Davis Ross
1963 – Col. Chuck Yeager
1964 – No award
1965 – Richard S. Johnston
1966 – No award
1967 – No award
1968 – Fred Forbes
1969 – Edward L. Hays and James V. Correale
1970 – Robert E. Smylie and Charles Lutz
1971 – Robert E. Breeding and Leonard Shepard
1972 – Harold I. Johnson
1973 – Walter Guy and Harley Stutesman, Jr.
1974 – Bruce McCandless II and Charles E. Whitsett, Jr.
1975 – David C. Schultz and Harold J. McMann
1976 – Larry E. Bell and Robert M. Bernarndin
1977 – No award
1978 – James W. McBarron II
1979 – Maurice A. Carson and Frederick A. Keune
1980 – No award
1981 – No award
1982 – Wilbert E. Ellis and James M. Waligora
1983 – No award
1984 – Bruce McCandless II
1985 – James D. van Hoften, William F. Fisher, Jerry L. Ross, and Sherwood C. Spring
1986 – Joseph P. Allen
1987 – Joseph J. Kosmo and Hubert C. Vykukal
1988 – Michael Brzezinski
1989 – 'No award1990 – Jerry L. Ross
1992 – Kathryn D. Sullivan
1993 – STS-49 Extravehicular Crew: Thomas D. Akers, Pierre J. Thuot, Richard J. Hieb, and Kathryn C. Thornton
1994 – STS-61 Extravehicular Crew: F. Story Musgrave, Thomas D. Akers, Jeffrey A. Hoffman, and Kathryn C. Thornton
1995 – Clifford W. Hess, Scott A. Bleisath, Mark C. Lee
1996 – Willy Z. Sadeh
1997 – Alan M. Rochford
1998 – Guy Severin
1999 – Jerry L. Ross and James H. Newman
2000 – Michael L. Gernhardt
2001 – No award2002 – G. Allen Flynt
2003 – No award2004 – No award2005 – No award2006 – Scott Crossfield (posthumous) and David Clark (posthumous)
2007 – Curtis A. Stephenson
2008 – Joseph Kittinger
2009 – Joseph A. Ruseckas
2010 – STS-125 EVA Team
2011 – Joseph Kosmo
2012 – Jan Stepanek
2013 – Felix Baumgartner and the Red Bull Stratos Team2013 - Award terminated''

See also

 List of engineering awards
 List of medicine awards
 List of space technology awards

References

Medicine awards
Aerospace engineering awards
Awards of the American Astronautical Society